Venus is the second planet from the Sun.

Venus or VENUS may also refer to:

 Venus (mythology), a Roman goddess

Arts and entertainment

Film
 Venus (1929 film), a silent French film
 Venus (1932 film), an Italian film
 Venus (2006 film), a British comedy-drama
 Venus (2017 film), a Canadian comedy-drama
 Venus (2022 film), a Spanish-language horror

Music

Bands
 Venus (Belgian band)
 Vênus, a Brazilian heavy metal group

Albums
 Venus (Hello Venus EP) (2012)
 Venus (We Are the Fury album) (2007)
 Venus (Joy Williams album) (2015)
 Vénus, a 2008 album by Sheryfa Luna
 Venus, a 2014 EP by Jett Rebel

Songs
 "Venus" (Frankie Avalon song), released in 1959
 "Venus" (Lady Gaga song), released in 2013
 "Venus" (Shocking Blue song)
 "Venus" (Tackey & Tsubasa song)
 "Venus", a song from the 2004 album Talkie Walkie by Air
 "Venus", a 2013 song by Azealia Banks
 "Venus", a song from the 1993 album  Cyberpunk by Billy Idol
 "Venus", a song from the 2001 album Weird Revolution by Butthole Surfers
 "Venus", a song from the 2011 album Eclipse by Journey
 "Venus", a 1997 single by Low
 "Venus", a song from the 2012 album The Return by Shinhwa
 "Venus", a song from the 1977 album Marquee Moon by Television
 "Venus", a single from the 1998 album  Supersystem by The Feelers
 "Venus", a song from the 1998 album Aégis by Theatre of Tragedy

Other music
 "Venus, the Bringer of Peace", a movement from Gustav Holst's orchestral suite The Planets
 Venus (opera), a 1922 opera by Othmar Schoeck

In print
 Venus (novel), a 2000 science fiction novel by Ben Bova
 Venus series, a series of science fiction novels by Edgar Rice Burroughs
 Venus (Marvel Comics), the name of two comic book characters
 Venus (comic book)

Other uses in arts and entertainment
 Venus (mural), by Knox Martin
 Venus (play), by Suzan-Lori Parks, 1996
 Venus Award, a German adult film award

Businesses
 Venus Centre, a dubbing company in Syria
 Venus Fashion, a fashion retailer 
 Venus Optics, a manufacturer of photographic lenses
 Venus Pencils, a pencil brand
 Venus Records, a Japanese jazz record label
 Venus Records & Tapes, an Indian record label
 Venus (SiriusXM), a radio station
 Venus Zine, a quarterly US magazine

People and fictional characters
 Venus (given name), including a list of people and fictional characters with the name
 Venus (surname), a list of people

Places

United States
 Venus, Florida, an unincorporated community
 Venus, Missouri, an unincorporated community
 Venus, Nebraska, an unincorporated community
 Venus, Pennsylvania, an unincorporated community
 Venus, Texas, a town
 Venus, West Virginia, an unincorporated community

Elsewhere
 Venus, Chennai, India, a neighborhood
 Venus, Romania, a summer resort
 Venus Bay, South Australia, Australia
 Venus Bay, Victoria, Australia
 Venus Bay (New Zealand)
 Venus Glacier, Alexander Island, Antarctica
 Point Venus, Tahiti, a peninsula

Science and technology
 Venus (bivalve), a genus of clams
 VENUS (Victoria Experimental Network Under the Sea), an oceanographic observatory in British Columbia, Canada
 VENµS, a joint satellite mission between the Israeli Space Agency and the CNES
 Venus, a yellow fluorescent protein derivative
 Gillette Venus, a razor
 LG Venus, a mobile phone 
 Microsoft Venus, an aborted a set-top operating system
 Walter Venus, a 1920s aircraft engine
 Venus Automobile, a 1950s American custom car
 Venus Engine, an image processing system for cameras

Ships
 Venus (ship), several ships
 French ship Vénus, several French ships and vessels
 HMS Venus, several ships of the Royal Navy
 MV Venus, several merchant ships
 SS Venus, several steamships
 Swedish frigate Venus (1783)
 TSS Princess Maud (1934), later renamed Venus 
 USS Venus (AK-135), a United States Navy cargo ship
 Venus (yacht), a yacht built for Steve Jobs

Other uses
 Venus (astrology), a planet in astrology
 Venus (cat), a cat with unusual markings
 Venus figurine, Paleolithic carvings
 Venus (typeface)
 FC Venus București, a Romanian football team
 Stadionul Venus, a stadium in Bucharest

See also
 
 
 Venous, pertaining to veins
 Venus de Milo (disambiguation)
 Venus Project (disambiguation)